The largest of the Souhane massacres took place in the small mountain town of Souhane (about 25 km south of Algiers, between Larbaa and Tablat) on 20–21 August 1997.  64 people were killed, and 15 women kidnapped; the resulting terror provoked a mass exodus, bringing the town's population down from 4000 before the massacre to just 103 in 2002.  Smaller-scale massacres later took place on November 27, 1997 (18 men, 3 women, 4 children killed) and 2 March 2000, when some 10 people from a single household were killed by guerrillas.  The massacres were blamed on Islamist groups such as the GIA.

See also
 List of Algerian massacres of the 1990s
 List of massacres in Algeria

External links
 Souhane in 2005
 Turkish Daily News
 Violence
 Dagsbladet

Algerian massacres of the 1990s
1997 in Algeria
Massacres in 1997
Conflicts in 1997
August 1997 events in Africa